Ireland was represented by 33 athletes at the 2010 European Athletics Championships held in Barcelona, Spain.

Participants

Results

References 

Nations at the 2010 European Athletics Championships
2010
European Athletics Championships